Jim Ford (born September 15, 1981) is an American film and television actor, stuntman, screenwriter and film director.  He wrote and directed the short films Reconnaissance (2007), Gotta Go (2008), Wiffle Ball (2008), Timmy Text Message (2009), and White Zin (2010).

Background
Ford was born in Worcester, Massachusetts. He is the son of Linda, a Nurse Practitioner, and John Ford, a Fire-fighter.
Ford grew up in West Boylston, Massachusetts. He graduated from St. John's High School in 2000 and went to the University of Hartford where he received a B.F.A. in theatre from the Hartt School conservatory.  Ford participated in sports growing up, including BMX, snowboarding and skateboarding.  He enrolled in a sketch comedy class when in 6th grade at The Bancroft school, and was able to write and direct his own skits and imitate some of the faculty, after which he began doing plays and short films.  With the help of friends he completed over a dozen short films and two full length feature films before his senior year of high school.

Career
Shortly after graduating from college in 2004, Ford moved to New York City. He landed an agent within months and began working immediately. He landed several commercials for companies such as The World Poker Tour, Snickers, Stride Gum, Microsoft, New York Lottery, although his first film job was as a football player in Across the Universe. Next was the low-budget horror film Knock Knock. Jim had landed several roles in television shows such as Gossip Girl, Law and Order, The Sopranos, Fringe, and Blue Bloods.  Ford was also the 2007-2009 face of Intel. It was a worldwide print campaign that had his face and body on billboards and magazines all around the world. In a short time Jim has completed over 100 films, TV shows, commercials and acted or performed stunts alongside actors like: Edward Norton, Colin Farrell, Christopher Walken, Gerard Butler, Tom Cruise, Cameron Diaz, Adam Sandler, and Kevin James. He earned his first Screen Actors Guild Nomination for his work on the film The Irishman.

Filmography

Film

 Shuffle Mode (2006) as Bathroom Thinker
 Mo (2007) as Barry
 I Now Pronounce You Chuck and Larry (2007) as Criminal stuck in the chimney (uncredited)
 Knock Knock (2007) as Billy Smith
 Across the Universe (film) (2007) as Football Player
 Reconnaissance (2007) as Nick Navy
 The Crate (2007) (V) as Tim Reeves
 Symmetry Symmetry (2008) as Nahthan Repper
 Wiffle Ball (2008) as Rickey Runner
 Kung Fu Granny (2008) as Peach
 Frat House Massacre (2008) as Rabbit
 7 Million Tickets (2008) as Ben Thelsman
 Car Valet (2009) as Timmy
 Timmy Text Message (2009) as Timmy Text
 Black Eyed Girl (2009) as Ezra Otis
 The Town (2010) as FBI Swat (uncredited)
 White Zin (2010) as Jim Beringer
 Toolbox Bandit (2010) as Luke Dawson
 All In (2010) as Joey
 Revenge of the Green Dragons (2014) as Anthony Gallivan
 Touched with Fire (2015) as Police Officer (uncredited)
 American Dresser (2018) as Gavin
 A Vigilante (2018) as Barfly #3
 We Have Your Wife (2018) as Greg Smith

Television

 The Maury Povich Show (1 episode, 2005) as John
 Conviction (2 episodes, 2006) as Assistant District Attorney
 The Sopranos (1 episode, 2006) as Cashier
 Law & Order (1 episode, 2006) as Skateboarder
 Gossip Girl (1 episode, 2008) as Joe
 Fringe (1 episode, 2009) as Tech #3
 Gravity (2010) as Bike Messenger
 Gotham (2 episodes, 2015) As Adam Jadowsky
 The Mysteries of Laura (1 episode, 2015) as Ronald
 Madam Secretary (1 episode, 2016) as Ron Janeway
 Blue Bloods (1 episode, 2016) as Driver

Video games

 L.A. Noire (2011) as Additional Voices (voice) (uncredited)
 Grand Theft Auto V (2013) as Various (voice) (uncredited)

Stunts

 One Tree Hill (1 episode, 2006) (TV)
 The Sopranos (1 episode, 2007) (TV)
 I Now Pronounce You Chuck & Larry (2007)
 CSI: NY (1 episode, 2007) (TV)
 College Road Trip (2008)
 John Adams (5 episodes, 2008) (TV)
 Pride and Glory (2008)
 Frat House Massacre (2008)
 The Clique (2008) (V)
 Friday Night Lights (1 episode, 2008) (TV)
 The Maiden Heist (2009)
 As the World Turns (2 episodes, 2009) (TV)
 The Good Heart (2009)
 Leaves of Grass (2009)
 Law Abiding Citizen (2009)
 Surrogates (2009)
 The Bleeding (2009)
 When in Rome (2010)
 The Bounty Hunter (2010)
 Ugly Betty (2 episodes, 2008–2010) (TV)
 Knight and Day (2010)
 The Irishman (2019)
 Glass (2019)

Literature 

 2020- My Take on All Fifty States - non-fiction

Awards and honors 
Ford received a Screen Actors Guild Nomination for his role as a stunt performer in the movie, The Irishman.

References

External links
Official website
 
Review of Ford's short film, Small World

1981 births
Living people
American male film actors
American stunt performers
American male television actors
Male actors from Worcester, Massachusetts
University of Hartford Hartt School alumni
People from West Boylston, Massachusetts
American male screenwriters
American male writers
21st-century American male actors
Film directors from Massachusetts
Screenwriters from Massachusetts